4672 Takuboku, provisional designation , is a background asteroid from the outer regions of the asteroid belt, approximately  in diameter. It was discovered on 17 April 1988, by Japanese astronomers Seiji Ueda and Hiroshi Kaneda at the Kushiro Observatory on Hokkaido, Japan. The asteroid was named after the Japanese poet Takuboku Ishikawa. In 2005, measurement of the body's occultation ellipse also gave 35.0 × 35.0 kilometers.

Orbit and classification 

Takuboku is a non-family asteroid from the main belt's background population. It orbits the Sun in the outer main-belt at a distance of 3.0–3.3 AU once every 5 years and 8 months (2,078 days; semi-major axis of 3.19 AU). Its orbit has an eccentricity of 0.05 and an inclination of 16° with respect to the ecliptic.

Physical characteristics 

Takuboku has an absolute magnitude of between 10.90 and 11.4. As of 2018, no rotational lightcurve of Takuboku has been obtained from photometric observations. The body's rotation period, pole and shape remain unknown.

Diameter and albedo 

According to the surveys carried out by the NEOWISE mission of NASA's Wide-field Infrared Survey Explorer and the Infrared Astronomical Satellite IRAS, Takuboku measures 28.115 and 35.59 kilometers in diameter and its surface has an albedo of 0.108 and 0.0609, respectively.

Occultation 

On 13 June 2005, Takuboku occulted 9.3 magnitude star TYC 0312-00789-1, causing a predicted magnitude drop 6.8 during 4.3 seconds. The occultation was visible over the southern island of New Zealand only. Measurement of the asteroid's occultation dimensions 35.0 ×35.0 for its major and minor best-fit ellipse (the fit's quality code is 1).

Naming 

This minor planet was named after Japanese poet Takuboku Ishikawa (1886–1912) who lived in Japan's late Meiji-era. He is best known for Ichiaku no Suna (A Handful of Sand) a collection of 551 tanka poems published in 1910. The official naming citation was published by the Minor Planet Center on 10 November 1992.

Notes

References

External links 
  List of asteroid occultation fits, (best fits only), February 2017
 Dictionary of Minor Planet Names, Google books
 Discovery Circumstances: Numbered Minor Planets (1)-(5000) – Minor Planet Center
 
 

004672
Discoveries by Seiji Ueda
Discoveries by Hiroshi Kaneda
Named minor planets
19880417